Korobovshchinsky is a rural locality (a settlement) in Razdolyevskoye Rural Settlement, Kolchuginsky District, Vladimir Oblast, Russia. The population was 30 as of 2010.

Geography 
Korobovshchinsky is located 9 km southwest of Kolchugino (the district's administrative centre) by road. Avdotyino is the nearest rural locality.

References 

Rural localities in Kolchuginsky District